The Bonar River is a short river of New Zealand. It is in Mount Aspiring National Park and flows west for  before joining the Waiatoto River.

See also
List of rivers of New Zealand

References
Land Information New Zealand - Search for Place Names

Rivers of the West Coast, New Zealand
Mount Aspiring National Park
Rivers of New Zealand